Isabel of Sabran (1297 – 7 May 1315) was a princess of Majorca.

She was daughter of Isnard of Sabran, Lord of Ansouis, and Margaret of Villehardouin.

Isabel married Ferdinand of Majorca in 1314. She gave birth to the future James III of Majorca in 1315. She died a few months after giving birth.

Sources
 
 «Isabel de Sabran». L'Enciclopèdia.cat. Barcelona: Grup Enciclopèdia Catalana.

References

Spanish princesses
1297 births
1315 deaths
Villehardouin family